Hilary D. Marston is an American physician-scientist and global health policy advisor specializing in pandemic preparedness. She is the Chief Medical Officer of the Food and Drug Administration.

Career 
Marston worked for McKinsey & Company and at the Bill & Melinda Gates Foundation as a program officer and special assistant. She then studied internal medicine at Brigham and Women's Hospital. In 2013, Marston joined National Institute of Allergy and Infectious Diseases (NIAID). She has experience in outbreak response, including Zika virus and Ebola. Marston served as a medical officer and policy advisor for global health and pandemic preparedness at NIAID. On April 15, 2020, Marston was the inaugural speaker at the NIH Intramural Research Program's new COVID-19 scientific interest group. Her presentation was titled "The Biomedical Research Response to COVID-19: A View from NIAID." In 2022, Marston joined the US Food and Drug Administration as Chief Medical Officer. She succeeded Janet Woodcock.

Selected works

References 

Living people
Year of birth missing (living people)
Place of birth missing (living people)
21st-century American women physicians
21st-century American physicians
21st-century American women scientists
American medical researchers
Women medical researchers
Ebola researchers
COVID-19 researchers
National Institutes of Health people
Perelman School of Medicine at the University of Pennsylvania alumni
Harvard School of Public Health alumni
Yale College alumni
Food and Drug Administration people